The Manège (Exercise house) is a historical building in Veliky Novgorod. It was built in 1843–51.

The structure was used first as a building were intended for training infantry and cavalry in cold weather and was used for its intended purpose until the Great Patriotic War.

In 1946–1982, a motor repair plant was located in the building.

After reconstruction in 1999–2001, the building is used as the Manege sports complex.

References

External links 
 History of the Manege building
 

Buildings and structures in Veliky Novgorod
Buildings and structures completed in 1851
Cultural heritage monuments in Novgorod Oblast